Guns Don't Kill People... Lazers Do is the debut full-length studio album by the American electronic dance music band Major Lazer, which at the time consisted of Diplo and Switch. The album is heavily influenced by Jamaican dancehall music and features guest appearances from Jamaican artists on every track.

Reception

Guns Don't Kill People... Lazers Do was critically acclaimed by critics among release, Rhapsody called it the 10th best album of 2009. After the album's release, Major Lazer was commercially and critically accepted amongst the reggae community and are often credited for changing the dancehall, reggae and moombahton community and genres, making them more commercially accepted in the United States.

Track listing

Charts

References

2009 debut albums
Major Lazer albums
Albums produced by Major Lazer
Downtown Records albums